A constitutional referendum was held in Panama on November 15, 1992. Voters were asked whether they approved of a series of amendments to the 1972 constitution, including reducing the power of the armed forces. Only 32.83% voted in favour of the reforms, with a turnout of 40%.

Results

References

1992 referendums
Referendums in Panama
1992 in Panama
Constitutional referendums